Didn't They Do Well is a short-lived BBC television quiz show presented by Bruce Forsyth that ran from 15 January to 18 March 2004. It consisted of archive television clips, many of which were from previous quiz show episodes, in which modern day contestants were shown a question and then asked to answer it. Its title was one of Forsyth's catchphrases when hosting The Generation Game in the 1970s and again in the 1990s.

List of quizmasters shown
Magnus Magnusson
Bob Monkhouse
Bob Mortimer
Jeremy Paxman
Vic Reeves
Anne Robinson
Jimmy Tarbuck

External links

BBC television game shows
2000s British game shows
2004 British television series debuts
2004 British television series endings